Hosenabad may refer to:
 Hosenabad-e Bala
 Hosenabad-e Pain